Khaled Ben Sassi (born 31 March 1962) is a Tunisian football manager and former player who played as a forward.

References

1962 births
Living people
Tunisian footballers
Association football forwards
Canet Roussillon FC players
Étoile Sportive du Sahel players
Tunisian expatriate footballers
Expatriate footballers in France
Tunisian expatriate sportspeople in France
Tunisian football managers
AS Kasserine managers
Étoile Sportive du Sahel managers
EGS Gafsa managers
Stade Tunisien managers
Sfax Railways Sports managers
LPS Tozeur managers
US Monastir (football) managers
AS Marsa managers
US Ben Guerdane managers
AS Gabès managers